Temple Hill, also known as Tsz Wan Shan, is a hill between New Kowloon and the New Territories, Hong Kong. It peaks at 488 m. Beneath its south side is the residential area of Tsz Wan Shan and Buddhist temples. Sha Tin Pass runs between the hill and Unicorn Ridge. The summit of the hill is located within Sha Tin District.

References

See also

 List of mountains, peaks and hills in Hong Kong
Eight Mountains of Kowloon

Sha Tin District
New Kowloon
Tsz Wan Shan
Mountains, peaks and hills of Hong Kong